Flatbush Avenue is a bus rapid transit station on the CTfastrak line, located near the intersection of Flatbush Avenue and New Park Avenue in West Hartford, Connecticut. It opened with the line on March 28, 2015. The station consists of one island platform to the side of the busway, with passing lanes to allow express buses to pass buses stopped at the station. A CTrail Hartford Line commuter rail platform is planned to open in 2022 under the name West Hartford.

Railroad history
The New York and New England Railroad (and predecessor Hartford, Providence and Fishkill Railroad) operated a station named Charter Oak Park at Oakwood Street slightly to the south, serving the Charter Oak Park racing track and the Luna Park recreation area. It opened with the track in 1874, was rebuilt in 1900, and likely closed with the racetrack in 1940. The New Haven Railroad had an adjacent Oakwood station on its parallel Springfield Line; it opened in 1874 and was closed in the late 1890s after the New Haven's purchase of the NY&NE rendered it redundant.

Future plans
The Hartford Line commuter rail service between New Haven, Connecticut and Springfield, Massachusetts via Hartford commenced on June 16, 2018. It initially connects to CTfastrak at Union Station.

The 2012 environmental assessment for the Hartford Line included preliminary plans for four infill stations including West Hartford and Newington Junction; although they were not yet funded, this would allow future planning and construction to be expedited. On January 12, 2015, the state announced that $5.75 million in funding would be made available for environmental mitigation and design at ten Hartford Line and New Haven Line stations, including design funding for Hartford Line platforms at West Hartford and Newington Junction. In February 2017, the state announced an additional $50 million in funds, including money to complete design of West Hartford station. Design will be completed by 2020. The state aims to construct all infill stations on the line by 2022.

References

External links

CTfastrak
Transport infrastructure completed in 2015
2015 establishments in Connecticut
Buildings and structures in West Hartford, Connecticut
Bus stations in Hartford County, Connecticut
Proposed stations on the New Haven–Springfield Line